The 4th Parliament of Lower Canada was in session from January 9, 1805, to April 27, 1808. Elections to the Legislative Assembly in Lower Canada had been held in July 1804. All sessions were held at Quebec City.

References

External links 
  Assemblée nationale du Québec (French)
Journals of the House of Assembly of Lower Canada ..., John Neilson (1805)

04
1805 establishments in Lower Canada
1808 disestablishments in Lower Canada